New Vision School and College is located at Muzahid Nagar, Kadamtali Thana, Dhaka.  It was founded in January 2012 by Habibur Rahman Mollah.

Position
School on the 8th floor of its own land with a 5-storey building on the foundation of the school is underway.

Registration 
The school was founded on 1 January 2012. After 2 years, in 2014, it received official government agreement to run the school, and also in  2014 the JSC exams were held at the school for the first time.

See also
List of schools in Bangladesh

References

External links
Official website

Schools in Dhaka District
2012 establishments in Bangladesh
Educational institutions established in 2012